BionX was a Canadian maker of electric motors for bicycles as well as bicycle retrofit kits, operating from 1998-2018, originally named EPS (Electric Propulsion Systems) .

BionX was headquartered in Aurora, Ontario where motors were produced and assembled  before being marketed in over 15 countries. Research and development was based in Sherbrooke, Quebec. The European sales and service center was located near Munich, Germany.

History 
In 1998, entrepreneur Jean-Yves Dubé formed Energy and Propulsion Systems (EPS), a company in Quebec, Canada.  In 2000, the name was changed to "BionX".

In 2008, the company was acquired by Magna and by then its motors had become standard in many ebikes in Europe and North America, including bikes by Trek and Matra, Kalkhoff.

In 2011, Bionix introduced SeaScape, an electrically-assisted paddle-boat product line.

On February 27, 2018 BionX Canada went into receivership, its 80 employees were dismissed, and the company was shut down temporarily to find a buyer. Grant Thornton Limited was appointed as Receiver. In June 2018, parts of the business were sold off to three other businesses, and the rest of the company assets were liquidated via online auction that ended August 15, 2018. By October 2018, BionX's receiver sold the company’s intellectual property, patents, trademarks, software web domains as well as remaining inventory with court approval to Amego Electric Vehicles and its nominee Leisger Cycle Inc.

Motors 
BionX motors were typically mounted into an oversized rear wheel hub and were noted for their low noise;  regenerative braking capability and  hub-embedded motor controller.

The D series of motors was the most recent and strongest BionX technology with a torque of 25/50 Nm. The motor cylinder was larger but thinner than previous versions and weighed 4.0 kg (8.8 lb). Before that was the S series which with 3.5 kg (7.7 lb) was lighter than the P series at the same strength. The P series motors were the first produced by Bionx. They had a torque of 9/40 Nm at a weight of 4.7 kg (10.4 lb).

*Since the maximum legal power specifications in Watts are different for the same motor in North America and Europe, the name varies. For example, the P-350 is usually sold as the P-250 in Europe.

While Bionx had competition from several wheel hub-based motor companies, including Panasonic (e.g. KTM's eRace), Alber's Xion (lately in Kalkhoff bikes), Heinzmann, and GoSwiss, their primary competitor was the Bosch eBike.

See also 
 Pedelec
 Electric bicycle
 Electric motor

References

External links 

 ridebionx.com – BionX company homepage

Companies based in Ontario
Electric bicycles
Electric motors